Anne Jøtun (born 20 May 1955; married as Anne Bakke, later divorced and took her maiden name back) is a Norwegian curler and world champion. She participated on the silver team at the demonstration event at the 1992 Winter Olympics. She was born in Oslo, Norway and is currently living in Jar.

International championships
Jøtun is two times world champion, from 1990 and 1991.

She also won a gold medal at the 1990 European Curling Championships.

References

External links

 

1955 births
Living people
Norwegian female curlers
Curlers at the 1992 Winter Olympics
Olympic curlers of Norway
World curling champions
European curling champions